Grand Sachem was launched at Newburyport, Massachusetts in 1801. She was registered at Bideford in 1803, but until 1815 sailed from Milford Haven. Between approximately 1803 and 1822, she  made eight voyages as a whaler in the British southern whale fishery. She was last listed in 1822 and was broken up in 1826.

Career
Grand Sachem was first registered at Newburyport in December 1801 with Josiah Bartlett as master. She was registered again in November 1802 with Coffin Whippey as master.

After she sailed to England she was registered at Bideford in 1803. She did not appear in Lloyd's Register (LR) until 1810, suggesting that she remained owned in the United States.

1st whaling voyage (1803/1804–1805): At some point in 1803 or 1804 Grand Sachem sailed for the southern whale fishery. 

On 3 August 1805, Captain Woodriff, left St Helena as escort of a motley convoy to England. The convoy consisted of the East India company's "extra-ship" , from Madras, the southern whaler African from Desolation Island, the whaler Fox from the Mozambique channel, the whaler Grand Sachem from the Peruvian coast and bound to Milford, the Prussian ship Wilhelmina, which Calcutta had detained on her way out to St Helena, and the large Swedish ship Carolina, which was sailing from China and asked to join.

On 25 September 1805, the convoy was in the Channel south of the Isles of Scilly when it encountered  Allemand's squadron. Calcutta engaged the French squadron and was captured, sacrificing herself for the convoy, which escaped. Fox and Grand Sachem went into Kinsale.

2nd whaling voyage (1806–1808): Captain Coffin Whippey sailed from Milford Haven on 21 April 1806. In March-April 1807 Grand Sachem was off New Zealand. She arrived at Port Jackson from the fishery on 11 September 1807, with oil. She left for the fishery on 26 September, with oil. The record of her visit shows her as an American vessel. Grand Sachem and Inspector were full of oil and preparing to return to England. Grand Sachem arrived back in England on 11 August.

She first appeared in Lloyd's Register in the volume for 1810.

3rd whaling voyage (1809–1811): Captain Dunnaman sailed from London on 30 May 1809. Grand Sachem was at Cork on 17 June, bound for the South Seas. Around early August 1811 she was reported at Timor with 1500 barrels. Grand Sachem returned to Milford Haven on 11 November 1811.
 

She had lost the gudgeons of her rudder and Commander Alexander Renny, of Trinculo, had ordered Coffin to make for the nearest port.

In 1813 the British East India Company (EIC) had lost its monopoly on the trade between India and Britain. British ships were then free to sail to India or the Indian Ocean under a licence from the EIC. Grand Sachems owners applied for a licence to sail to certain ports in the East Indies under the provisions for whalers. They applied on 21 August and received the licence on 23 August.

On 31 July 1814 Grand Sachem was at St Helena, waiting for a convoy. She was at Falmuth on 29 October, described as a "full ship". Grand Sachem returned to Milford Haven  on 14 November 1814; she carried the product of the 96 whales she had killed.

Benjamin Rotch had suffered financial hardship and in 1814 he moved his family and several ships to London. Grand Sachem was offered for sale at auction in late July 1815, lying in the Surrey Canal. In 1815 ownership transferred to William & Daniel Bennett, London. 

5th whaling voyage (1815–1816): Captain James Downey sailed from London in 1815, bound for Desolation Island. He returned to London on 20 June 1816 with 360 casks of whale oil and 20 seal skins.

6th whaling voyage (1816–1818): Captain Joseph Darney sailed from London on 4 August 1816; on 4 September she was at Boa Vista, Cape Verde. She arrived at the Cape of Good Hope from Desolation Island on 15 February 1818, and sailed for London on 21 February. Grand Sachem arrived at  London on 5 May 1818 with 400 casks and 1600 seal skins. 

7th whaling voyage (1818–1819): On 22 June 1818, Grand Sachem, [David] Littlejohn, master, sailed from Gravesend, Kent for the South Seas. Two days later she was at Deal. On 3 February 1819 Grand Sachem, Littlejohn, master, was at South Georgia with 50 tuns of oil. Also there were Ann, Dowell, master, Brown, master, Arab, Barclay, master, and MaryAnn, Todrig, master. Grand Sachem returned to England on 28 May with 150 casks of oil and 180 seal skins. This cargo was worth perhaps £1,300.

8th whaling voyage (1819–1822): Captain Woodward sailed from London on 17 September 1819. On 23 August 1820, the schooner Magnet, Vine, master, spoke a boat from Grand Sachem off the island of Boure. Captain Vine learned that Captain White of Grand Sachem had died some time before, and that her first officer had deserted at Ambonya, following the levelling of some criminal accusations against him.

On 18 December 1821 Sisters, Earle, master, arrived at Milford Haven. She had left Grand Sachem "on the Coast" with 1200 barrels. Syren, Coffin, master, and Emerald were also there. On 16 November 1821 Grand Sachem, Wright, master, sailed for London from St Helena. On 15 January 1822. Grand Sachem, master, was at Deal, having come from Timor. On 22 January she arrived at Gravesend.

Fate
After her return to London Grand Sachem was laid up. She did not again appear in Lloyd's Lists ship arrival and departure data. Also, the volumes for 1823 of Lloyd's Register and the Register of Shipping no longer listed her. She was broken up in 1826.

Notes

Citations

References
 
 
 
 
 
 
 
 

1801 ships
Ships built in the United States
Whaling ships
Age of Sail merchant ships of England